The year 1953 in archaeology involved some significant events.

Excavations
 German excavations at Uruk resume.

Finds
 "Cave of Letters" at Nahal Hever in the Judaean Desert (with correspondence from the Bar Kokhba revolt of ca. 132–136 CE) identified.
 al-Khader Phoenician arrowheads.
 Jerusalem ossuaries found stored in a cave on the Mount of Olives near Jerusalem by Franciscans.
 The Narsaq stick is found in Greenland, the first example of Viking Age runic inscriptions found in the country.
 1st century Roman leather bikini briefs found in the City of London.

Events
 November 21: Piltdown Man is shown to be a hoax (first presented by Charles Dawson in 1912).

Publications
 O. G. S. Crawford - Archaeology in the Field (Dent).
 B. H. St.J. O'Neil - Castles: an introduction to the castles of England and Wales (HMSO).
 Gordon R. Willey - Prehistoric Settlement Patterns in the Virú Valley, Perú (Bureau of American Ethnology).

Births
 Mensun Bound, Falkland Islands-born maritime archaeologist
 Arlen F. Chase, American archaeologist whose work focuses on Mesoamerica

Deaths
 March 24: Félix-Marie Abel, French biblical archaeologist (b. 1878)

References

Archaeology
Archaeology
Archaeology by year